Queen Bee Entertainment is a record label owned by American rapper and songwriter Lil' Kim. It focuses on releasing LPs, Mixtape's, and EP's of the label's roster. The label's name is a reference to Lil' Kim's alias Queen Bee.

History
In 1999, Lil' Kim started her own label, after previously being contracted to Big Beat/Undeas. She got help from P.Diddy with starting her own label, and took Junior MAFIA with her. In December 1999, Kim then signed to Atlantic, which agreed to also provide distribution for the artists on her label. In 2006, Lil’ Kim partnered with Lance Rivera along with Queen Latifah's Flavor Unit which would be managing her career and be stake holders at the label. Kim was granted release out of her contract with Atlantic. In 2017, Lil’ Kim and the label signed a new distribution deal with eOne.

Artists
 Lil' Kim (CEO and President)
 Tiffany Foxx
 Junior MAFIA
 Lil' Cease
 Mr. Bristal
 Blake C

Discography

Albums released on label

Mixtape releases
 2008: Lil' Kim – Ms. G.O.A.T.
 2010: Sha Money XL – Sha Money
 2011: Lil' Kim – Black Friday
 2012: I.R.S South – Tax Season
 2012: Tiffany Foxx – Yellow Tape
 2013: I.R.S – The Compilation
 2014: Tiffany Foxx – King Foxx
 2014: Lil' Kim – Hard Core 2K14
 2016: Lil' Kim – Lil Kim Season

References

Lil' Kim
American record labels
Hip hop record labels
Contemporary R&B record labels
Big Beat Records (American record label) albums